Concurso Dominicano de Belleza 1969 was held at La Concha Acústica of El Embajador Hotel, in Santo Domingo on May 24, 1969. Rocio García Báez was crowned Miss Azúcar and represented the Dominican Republic at the Miss Universe 1969 pageant. The First Runner-up Sandra Simoné Cabrera Cabral won the Miss Café title and represented the Dominican Republic at the Miss World 1969. The Second Runner-up was Andreita Grullón Luna won the Miss Merengue Title participated at the annual Fair of the Chinita . in Venezuela. More than 30 participants entered the contest. 18 candidates where selected as semi-finalist the first night of the contest.  All contestants competed in swimsuit and evening gown

Results

Delegates

Azua - Adalgisa Castro Reina
Barahona - María Teresa Súarez Mora
Distrito Nacional - Carmen Cueto Vittini
Distrito Nacional - Celeste A. Franco
Distrito Nacional - Clarissa Andrickson
Distrito Nacional - Esperanza Peynado Matías
Distrito Nacional - Leila Escarramán
Distrito Nacional - Ligia Margarita Michel González
Distrito Nacional - Magaly Juliao
Distrito Nacional - Maritza Pichardo Garrido
Distrito Nacional - Amarilis Esperanza Pena Baez
Espaillat - Mayerling Bonnelly Sagredo
La Altagracia - Mercedes Critina Liberato
La Vega - Mebis Bueno Fabián
La Vega - Gricel Morillo Canela
La Vega - Ligia Giovanna Peña
Pedernales - Andreíta Grullón Luna
Peravia - Sandra Simone Cabrera Cabral
Puerto Plata - Sulamita Puig Miller
Samaná - Rocío María García Báez
San Cristóbal - Suany Altagracia Mateo
Santiago - Daysi Peña Rodríguez
Santiago - Diana Mercedes de Peña de los Santos
Santiago - Iluminada Jiménez
Santiago - Milagros Altagracia de la Cruz
Santiago - Miriam Jiminián
Santiago - Tilda Olimpia Pérez Guerra
Santiago Rodríguez - Ada Quintana Vera
Seibo - Andrea Safiro
Valverde - Carina Mercedes

Trivia

The following information appeared in an article published in the May 1969 edition of a national newspaper.
Title Rejected at Beauty Pageant
The winner of "Miss Cafe" award at the Dominican Beauty Pageant declared that she is not accepting the title because of "favoritism" in the selection of some candidates. Miss Sandra Cabrera Cabral said that she has received a lot of phone calls asking her not to accept the award. Miss Cafe said that the audience's applauses will be her only crown. She denied that her declining the award is due to not being elected Miss Azucar. "The reason of my rejection - she said - is because of the favoritism of the jury towards some candidates. "She stated that her declining of the award also includes rejecting the gifts that she's entitled to. The award includes a trip to Europe and a scooter.

References

External links
 Feria de la Chinita 

Miss Dominican Republic
1969 beauty pageants
1969 in the Dominican Republic